Bless Yo Trap is a collaborative mixtape by American rapper Smokepurpp and Canadian record producer Murda Beatz. It was released on April 13, 2018, by Alamo Records and Interscope Records. The mixtape features guest appearances from Lil Yachty, Offset, and ASAP Ferg.

The mixtape was supported by two singles: "123" and "Do Not Disturb" (featuring Lil Yachty and Offset).

Track listing
Credits adapted from Tidal and BMI.

Notes
  signifies an uncredited co-producer.

Charts

References

2018 mixtape albums
Interscope Records albums
Smokepurpp albums
Albums produced by Murda Beatz
Albums produced by Cubeatz